Charles Curtis Berghofer (born June 14, 1937), professionally known as Chuck Berghofer, is an American jazz double bassist and electric bassist, who has worked as a studio musician and in the film industry for more than 60 years, including working on more than 400 movie soundtracks.

Early life 
Chuck Berghofer was born in Denver, Colorado, and moved with his family to Arcadia, California when he was eight. With a lineage of musicians in the family (his grandfather had played with John Philip Sousa, and his uncle played tuba with the Saint Louis Symphony), Berghofer took interest in music at an early age, playing trumpet at the age of eight.  He also played the tuba in grade school and high school until moving to the double bass at the age of 18.  As a young adult, as he began venturing out to jazz night clubs, he came to admire bassist Ralph Peña and was able to persuade Peña to take him on as a student.

According to Berghofer, he always felt as though his music was heavily influenced by Leroy Vinnegar, Paul Chambers and Ray Brown. He also admired the work of Scott LaFaro and told musician and journalist Gordon Jack, "The best soloist on the instrument was Red Mitchell ... I loved to hear him solo."

Professional career 
Two years after he took up the bass, Berghofer, joined an orchestra, led by Skinnay Ennis for a tour of the midwest and then joined with Bobby Troup.  As his career progressed he eventually replaced his former tutor, Peña, in a duo with Pete Jolly, which later expanded into a trio with the addition of drummer Nick Martinis.  In the 1960s he became a member of Shelly Manne's band, taking on a bassist position at Manne's night club Shelly's Manne-Hole, and had the opportunity to play alongside numerous leading jazz musicians of the era, including Jack Sheldon, Conte Candoli, Frank Rosolino, Rahsaan Roland Kirk and Philly Joe Jones. During this time, he also recorded with popular singers such as Elvis Presley and The Everly Brothers.

He was a member of the Abnuceals Emuukha Electric Symphony Orchestra around 1967 when Frank Zappa recorded the orchestral parts for Lumpy Gravy.

With his lengthy career in film, Berghofer was also quite accomplished as a house jazz musician.  He formed a semi-regular house band at Donte's in Los Angeles with pianist Frank Strazzeri and drummer Nick Ceroli and was videotaped playing with Roger Kellaway and drummer Larry Bunker as they backed Zoot Sims.  Among others he accompanied were Ray Charles, Bob Cooper, Ella Fitzgerald, Stan Getz, Peggy Lee, Shelly Manne, Gerry Mulligan, Art Pepper, Frank Rosolino, Seth MacFarlane, and Frank Sinatra.

In 2019, Berghofer, along with fellow Wrecking Crew members Don Randi and Don Peake and in conjunction with Denny Tedesco (producer and director of the 2008 film The Wrecking Crew), performed around the Los Angeles area with their The Wrecking Crew's Farewell to Glen Campbell live shows.

Film, television, and popular music 
As Berghofer made his career as a jazz musician, he landed a prominent role recording with Nancy Sinatra in "These Boots Are Made For Walkin".  He also worked on television with Glen Campbell, recorded with Frank Sinatra, and played with Barbra Streisand, in which they did a recording of Funny Lady. His film work extends to 400 appearances, leading to his being awarded in the mid-1980s the National Academy of Recording Arts and Sciences Award as the most valuable bass player for four consecutive years. In that decade he recorded with Mel Tormé and later recorded again with Sinatra on Duets.  During his career, Berghofer has performed on over 400 movie soundtracks. Just a few of the films he has worked on include Rocky II (1979), The Majestic (2001), Sing (2016), and Clint Eastwood’s Bird (1988). He also worked on such television shows as Barney Miller (on which he played the opening bassline), Charlie’s Angels, The Carol Burnett Show, The Simpsons and Star Trek: Enterprise. His bassline on Barney Miller inspired Cliff Burton to learn how to play bass.

Discography
With Christina Aguilera
 My Kind of Christmas (RCA Records, 2000)
With Paul Anka
 Songs Of December (Decca Records, 2012)
With Hoyt Axton
 My Griffin Is Gone (Columbia, 1969)
With The Beach Boys
 Summer Days (And Summer Nights!!) (Capitol, 1965)
 Pet Sounds (Capitol, 1966)
With George Benson
 Inspiration: A Tribute to Nat King Cole (Concord Records, 2013)
With Mary J. Blige
 Mary (MCA Records, 1999)
 A Mary Christmas (Verve, 2013)
With Debby Boone
 Reflections of Rosemary (Concord, 2005)
With Michael Bublé
 Call Me Irresponsible (Reprise Records, 2007)
 Christmas (Reprise Records, 2011)
 To Be Loved (Reprise Records, 2013)
 Love (Reprise Records, 2018)
 Higher (Reprise Records, 2022)
With Vanessa Carlton
 Be Not Nobody (A&M, 2002)
With Rosemary Clooney
 For the Duration (Concord Records, 1991)
 Still on the Road (Concord Records, 1994)
 Dedicated to Nelson (Concord Records, 1996)
 White Christmas (Concord Records, 1996)
 Brazil (Concord Records, 2000)
With Adam Cohen
 Adam Cohen (Columbia Records, 1998)
With Natalie Cole
 Stardust (Elektra Records, 1996)
 Still Unforgettable (Atco Records, 2008)
With Ry Cooder
 Jazz (Warner Bros., 1978)
With Rita Coolidge
 And So Is Love (Paddle Wheel, 2005)
With Bobby Darin
 Venice Blue (Capitol Records, 1965)
With Matt Dusk
 Back in Town (Decca Records, 2006)
With The Everly Brothers
 In Our Image (Warner Bros., 1966)
 The Everly Brothers Sing (Warner Bros., 1967)
With Rebecca Ferguson
 Lady Sings the Blues (RCA Records, 2015)
With Melody Gardot
 Sunset in the Blue (Decca Records, 2020)
With Vince Gill
 Breath of Heaven: A Christmas Collection (MCA Records, 1998)
With Josh Groban
 Stages (Reprise Records, 2015)
With B.B. King and Diane Schuur
 Heart to Heart (GRP, 1994)
With Carole King
 A Holiday Carole (Concord, 2011)
With Irene Kral
 Wonderful Life (Mainstream, 1965)
With Diana Krall
 When I Look in Your Eyes (Verve Records, 1999)
With Peggy Lee
 In the Name of Love (Capitol, 1964)
With Seth MacFarlane
 No One Ever Tells You (Republic 2015)
With Melissa Manchester
 If My Heart Had Wings (Atlantic Records, 1995)
With Barry Manilow
 Manilow Sings Sinatra (Arista Records, 1998)
With Shelly Manne
 Live! Shelly Manne & His Men at the Manne-Hole (Contemporary, 1961)
 Shelly Manne & His Men Play Checkmate (Contemporary, 1961)
With Martina McBride
 It's the Holiday Season (Broken Bow Records, 2018)
With Paul McCartney
 Kisses on the Bottom (Hear Music, 2012)
With Carmen McRae
 Can't Hide Love (Blue Note, 1976)
With Bette Midler
 Bette Midler Sings the Rosemary Clooney Songbook (Columbia Records, 2003)
With Liza Minnelli
 Gently (Angel Records, 1996)
With Joni Mitchell
 Both Sides Now (Reprise Records, 2000)
 Travelogue (Nonesuch Records, 2002)
With Michael Nesmith
 The Wichita Train Whistle Sings (Dot Records, 1968)
With Tom Netherton
 Just As I Am (Word, 1976)
With Aaron Neville
 The Grand Tour (A&M Records, 1993)
With Steve Perry
 Traces (Fantasy, 2018)
With Ruth Price and Shelly Manne
 Ruth Price with Shelly Manne & His Men at the Manne-Hole (Contemporary, 1961)
With Emitt Rhodes
 The American Dreams (A&M Records, 1970)
With Howard Roberts
 Whatever's Fair! (Capitol Records, 1966)
With Diana Ross
 Take Me Higher (Motown, 1995)
With Seal
 Standards (Decca Records, 2017)
With Diane Schuur
 Love Songs (GRP, 1993)
 Music Is My Life (Atlantic Records, 1999)
 Friends for Schuur (Concord Records, 2000)
 Midnight (Concord Records, 2003)
With Blake Shelton
 Cheers, It's Christmas (Warner Bros. Records, 2012)
With Zoot Sims
 Quietly There: Zoot Sims Plays Johnny Mandel (Pablo, 1984)
With Nancy Sinatra
 Boots (Reprise Records, 1965)
 Sugar (Reprise Records, 1966)
 Nancy (Reprise Records, 1969)
With Rod Stewart
 Merry Christmas, Baby (Verve Records, 2012)
With Barbra Streisand
 The Movie Album (Columbia Records, 2003)
 What Matters Most (Columbia Records, 2011)
 Partners (Columbia Records, 2014)
 Encore: Movie Partners Sing Broadway (Columbia Records, 2016)
With Toni Tennille
 All of Me (Gaia Records, 1987)
With Sarah Vaughan
 Sarah Vaughan with Michel Legrand (Mainstream Records, 1972)
With Dionne Warwick
 Dionne Warwick Sings Cole Porter (Arista Records, 1990)
With Robbie Williams
 Swing When You're Winning (Chrysalis Records, 2001)
With Trisha Yearwood
 Let's Be Frank (Gwendolyn, 2018)

Filmography 
An incomplete list of his music and film credits.

See also 

 Jazz
 List of jazz bassists
 List of jazz musicians

References

External links
Chuck Berghofer Interview - NAMM Oral History Library (2016)

1937 births
Living people
Musicians from Denver
American male guitarists
West Coast jazz double-bassists
American jazz double-bassists
Male double-bassists
Guitarists from Colorado
20th-century American guitarists
Jazz musicians from Colorado
21st-century double-bassists
20th-century American male musicians
21st-century American male musicians
American male jazz musicians
The Capp-Pierce Juggernaut members